David Jefferson Griffith House is a historic home located near Gilbert, Lexington County, South Carolina. It was built in 1896, and is a rectangular, two-story frame, weatherboarded Late Victorian farmhouse with a standing seam metal hipped roof. It has a one-story, gable-roofed ell. The front façade features a two-tiered decorated porch. Also on the property is a hip-roofed well house.

It was listed on the National Register of Historic Places in 1983.

References

Houses on the National Register of Historic Places in South Carolina
Victorian architecture in South Carolina
Houses completed in 1896
Houses in Lexington County, South Carolina
National Register of Historic Places in Lexington County, South Carolina